Oscar Karpenkopf (born 10 May 1944) is an Argentine judoka. He competed in the men's lightweight event at the 1964 Summer Olympics.

References

1944 births
Living people
Argentine male judoka
Olympic judoka of Argentina
Judoka at the 1964 Summer Olympics
Place of birth missing (living people)